South Thormanby is an island off of the Sunshine Coast, British Columbia, Canada, located 17 km west of Sechelt.

Geography

The island is more rocky than its neighbour North Thormanby Island. There are two main hills on the island: Mount Seafield in the south and Spy Glass hill in the north. South of Mount Seafield there is a large lake in an area known locally as the farm.  Tattenham Ledge, a long shallow underwater shelf of rock, extends from the northern side of the island and is a hazard to navigation.  There are several small islands attached to South Thormanby island, including Pirate Rock and Merry Island to the South.  Welcome Passage separates South Thormanby Island from the mainland along the Sunshine Coast.

Wildlife and Vegetation

The island is quite heavily forested, mainly with second growth douglas fir and cedar. There are some semi-wild apple and cherry trees near the lake in the old farm. Other common tree species found on the island include hemlock, alder, arbutus, lodgepole pine, and broadleaf maple. Edible berries found on the island include salal, salmonberries, thimbleberries, huckleberries, and blackberries. In marshy areas bullrushes and swampgrass is found. It is estimated that the South Thormanby Island has a population of approximately 300 coast blacktail deer. Other small animals include mink, raccoons, squirrels, chipmunks, and birds of all sorts. There have also been beavers inhabiting the lake and in recent memory bears and cougars have been present on the island, though they are not believed to be present now. The area is well known for its fishing, especially salmon fishing.

History

There are five known shell middens on South Thormanby Island. It is thought that the natives used the island for hunting purposes.

The first European Explorer to visit Thormanby Island was Jose Maria Narváez who anchored here on July 12, 1791 and called Thormanby Island Isla de San Ignacio.

The name Thormanby was given to the island by Captain George Henry Richards who surveyed the area with the ship HMS Plumper in 1860. Thormanby was the name of the horse who won The Derby that year. Several other place names in the area come from the Epsom derby. The island is noted for its large bay, Buccaneer Bay, whose name was also taken from that of a race horse Buccaneer who won the Royal Hunt Cup at Ascot in 1861

The majority of the island was granted to a shopkeeper named Calvert Simson from Hastings Mill Store in Gastown as a crown grant in 1892. Around 1912, Simson had an old swamp cleared on the southern part of the island to establish a farm and orchard. The farm was abandoned in 1948 and the original buildings were demolished in the 1960s and 1970s.

During the 1920s and 1930s the Union Steamship Company made regular trips to the island from Vancouver and they had a float build in Buccaneer Bay. At the time, trails were constructed throughout the island and the various bays were named.

From 1951 until 1981, South Thormanby Island was selectively logged. 75% of the trees harvested were Coastal Douglas Fir and 25% were red cedar and balsam poplar. Most of the old trees that were not harvested were left because they were not suitable, though there is now a second growth forest throughout the island.

Beavers were introduced to the island in 1984 and 1985. They dammed part of the former farm meadow, creating the lake that currently exists there.

Simson Provincial Park occupies the southern part of the island.   The park was established in 1986 and named after Calvert Simson.  The park area includes the remains of the old abandoned farm and orchard. Most of the northern half of the island is still private property with a concentration of cottages along Buccaneer Bay and Water Bay.  South Thormanby Island is opposite Buccaneer Bay Provincial Park on North Thormanby Island. Buccaneer Bay, like Thormandby itself, was named for a racehorse, in this case named Buccaneer.

References 

Sunshine Coast (British Columbia)
Islands of the Gulf Islands